Ballyryan or Ballyreen (Ring's homestead) is a small inland mostly west-facing limestone crag in The Burren in County Clare, Ireland.  It is popular with rock climbers due to its easy access, the range of short easy-to-intermediate rock climbs, and its close proximity to the much larger and highly regarded, Ailladie rock-climbing sea-cliff; Ailladie is also locally known as the Ballyreen Cliffs or Ballyreen Point.

Rock climbing

The Ballyryan rock climbing crag is located right beside the Ailladie Car Park on the R477 road, which is opposite the Stone Wall section of the Ailladie sea–cliff (see map below).  While Ballyran's first rock climbing routes date from the early 1970s (e.g. Whose Corner (VS 4c), and Whacky (HS) grade), it is noted that Irish "Tiglin" climbing groups conducted courses on many Ballyryan routes without recording their ascents.

While most of Ballyryan's routes are circa 10–12 metres high and between Diff to HVS, its proximity to Ailladie, with its numerous severe climbs, has led to a number of E–grade climbs being put up in the crag, namely, Agony Aunt (E2 5c) and Crack 90 (E3 6a).  For various reasons, Ballyryan's rock climbing routes are sometimes described as being "difficult to protect" when "leading", and therefore an extra degree of caution is needed. Novice climbers can "toprope" for safety.

The cliff is named after the townland in which it is located, Ballyryan;  the term Ballyreen is also used locally.

Climbing bibliography

See also

Ailladie, major rock climbing limestone sea–cliff in County Clare
Aill na Cronain, inland rock climbing limestone crag in County Clare, right beside the Aillwee Cave 
Fair Head, major rock climbing dolerite mountain crag in County Antrim
Dalkey Quarry, major rock climbing granite quarry in Dublin

References

External links
 Irish Climbing Wiki Ballyryan Online Database
 UK Climbing.com Ballyryan Online Database
 Ballyryan Limestone Cliff, Aerial drone overview

Climbing areas of Ireland
Geography of County Clare
Tourist attractions in County Clare